is a Japanese anime television series aimed to promote Urawa in Saitama Prefecture, Japan. The series aired in Japan from April to June 2015. A second season titled Musasino! was scheduled to premiere in July 2017, but was delayed to July 2022.

Plot
The series is set in Urawa, Saitama City, Saitama Prefecture.

Characters
The eight main characters represent the stations in Saitama Prefecture that bear "Urawa" on those names. All main voice cast are natives of Saitama Prefecture.

A freshman who joins the Railway Club.  She has a cheerful personality.

Usagi's best friend from middle school and a member of the Railway Club.

Class 2-A representative and a member of the Railway Club. She gets teased by Minami much to her chagrin.

The school's delusional student council president.  She wears cat ears and bat wings and has unrealistic ambitions to take over the school, and eventually Saitama.  She sees the Railway Club as a big obstacle.

The student council vice president. She is a ninja fanatic.

A member of the Railway Club.

President of the Railway Club.  

The president of the public morals committee.  She has a poor sense of direction.

Media

Anime
An anime television series produced by A-Real and directed by Mitsuyuki Ishibashi aired from April 10 to June 26, 2015, on TV Saitama. The anime series also aired on KBS Kyoto starting April 13, 2015. Crunchyroll started to stream the anime on April 9, 2015. A second season titled  was set to premiere in July 2017, but suffered a lengthy delay eventually premiering July 2, 2022.

Episode list

References

External links
Urawa no Usagi-chan website - March 2016 archive 

Musasino! official website 
Musasino! (anime) at Anime News Network's encyclopedia

2015 anime television series debuts
2022 anime television series debuts
Anime with original screenplays
Comedy anime and manga
Crunchyroll anime
Japanese comedy television series
Japanese high school television series
School life in anime and manga